Maharajganj  is a former village development committee that is now a Municipality in Kapilvastu District in the Lumbini Province of southern Nepal. At the time of the 1991 Nepal census it had a population of 10,454 people living in 1779 individual households. A small flood in 1993 ruined a marginal amount of cropland.

References

Populated places in Kapilvastu District